Andrzej Iwanecki (born 3 November 1960 in Siemianowice Śląskie) is a Polish auxiliary bishop in the Roman Catholic Diocese of Gliwice.

Life
He was born into a Catholic family. Between 1979 and 1986, he studied philosophy and theology in the High Silesian Seminary (:pl:Wyższe Śląskie Seminarium Duchowne w Katowicach). He began his studies in Kracow, then after one year the seminary was removed to Katowice. During study he worked as a miner in the coal mining area in Siemianowice (:pl:Kopalnia Węgla Kamiennego Siemianowice) for one year.

He was ordained a priest on 24 March 1985 by bishop Damian Zimoń in the cathedral of Christ the King in Katowice.

References

Living people
1960 births
People from Siemianowice Śląskie
21st-century Roman Catholic bishops in Poland
Auxiliary bishops